Aducanumab, sold under the brand name Aduhelm, is a medication designed to treat Alzheimer's disease (AD). It is a monoclonal antibody that targets aggregated forms (plaque) of amyloid beta (Aβ) found in the brains of people with Alzheimer's disease to reduce its buildup. It was developed by Biogen and Eisai.

Aducanumab was approved for medical use in the United States by the Food and Drug Administration (FDA) in June 2021, in a controversial decision that led to the resignation of three advisers to the FDA in the absence of evidence that the drug is effective. The FDA stated that it represents a first-of-its-kind treatment approved for Alzheimer's disease and that it is the first new treatment approved for Alzheimer's since 2003. Aducanumab's approval is controversial for numerous reasons including ambiguous clinical trial results regarding efficacy, the high cost of the drug and the very high rate of serious adverse events. The FDA considers it to be a first-in-class medication.

In November 2020, a panel of outside experts for the FDA concluded that a pivotal study of aducanumab failed to show strong evidence that the drug worked, citing questionable efficacy and multiple red flags found with the data analysis. There were also significant health risks associated with the drug; brain swelling or brain bleeding was found in 41% of patients enrolled in the studies. Nevertheless, the drug was approved under the FDA's accelerated approval pathway, and the FDA requires Biogen to perform follow-up reviews to assure the drug is a safe and effective treatment for Alzheimer's disease. The Office of Inspector General, U.S. Department of Health and Human Services was asked to investigate interaction between the drug company and the FDA prior to the drug's approval.

Medical uses 
In the U.S., Aducanumab is indicated for the treatment of Alzheimer's disease. In July 2021, the U.S. Food and Drug Administration (FDA) limited the indication to people with mild cognitive impairment or mild dementia stage of disease, the population in which treatment was initiated in clinical trials.

Aducanumab is given as an intravenous infusion, which is repeated approximately every four weeks.

Mechanism of action 
Aducanumab is a monoclonal IG1 antibody that binds to the amyloid beta protein at amino acids 3–7, which is posited to result in slowing the progression of Alzheimer's disease.

Adverse effects 
Amyloid-related imaging abnormalities (ARIA) are monitored by magnetic resonance imaging of the brain one to two times per year.

The most common serious adverse reactions reported are:
 ARIA-E edema of brain (35% of patients treated with Aduhelm vs 3% of patients treated with placebo) – Symptoms may include headache, changes in mental state, confusion, vomiting, nausea, tremor and gait disturbances.
 “Headache” (21% vs 16%), including headache, head discomfort, migraine, migraine with aura, and occipital neuralgia.
 ARIA-H microhemorrhage or bleeding of brain (19% vs 7%) – Symptoms can include headache, one-sided weakness, vomiting, seizures, decreased level of consciousness, and neck stiffness.
 ARIA-H superficial siderosis (hemosiderin) (15% vs 2%)
 Fall (15% vs 12%)
 Diarrhea (9% vs 7%)
 Confusion/delirium/altered mental status/disorientation (8% vs 4%)

History 
Aducanumab was developed by Biogen Inc., which licensed the drug candidate from Neurimmune, who discovered it  with the University of Zurich.

Clinical trials
Interim results from the second Phase I study of the drug were reported in March 2015.

A Phase Ib study was published in August 2016, based on one year of "monthly intravenous infusions" of aducanumab, with brain scans to measure amyloid plaques.
Phase II trials were not required by the FDA and were not conducted by Biogen for aducanumab, a decision that received criticism from some experts. Phase III trials followed the conclusion of Phase I studies.

Phase III clinical trials were ongoing in September 2016, but were canceled in March 2019 after "an independent group's analysis show[ed] that the trials were unlikely to 'meet their primary endpoint.'"

Biogen halted development of the drug in March 2019, after preliminary data from two phase III trials suggested it would not meet the primary endpoint.

On 22 October 2019, Biogen announced that it would be restarting the FDA approval process for aducanumab stating that analysis of a larger dataset claimed that the drug reduced clinical decline in patients with early Alzheimer's disease when given at higher doses. In the first trial, "EMERGE",(NCT02484547), an analysis split by dose indicated that high doses reduced rate of decline by 23% versus placebo. A second identical trial, "ENGAGE", failed to replicate this, with a non-significant 2% reduction in decline compared to placebo. The FDA accepted Biogen's aducanumab Biologics License Application (BLA) on 7 August 2020 with a Priority Review.

FDA review and approval
In November 2020, a panel of outside experts on the FDA's Peripheral and Central Nervous System Advisory Committee concluded that a pivotal study of aducanumab failed to show "strong evidence" that the drug worked, along with potential safety issues, and suggested that the FDA not approve aducanumab, citing questionable efficacy and multiple "red flags" found with the data analysis.

Aducanumab was approved for medical use in the United States on 7 June 2021, and was the first Alzheimer's treatment to receive approval through an accelerated pathway.

Coverage in the United States
The Center for Medicare and Medicaid Services (CMS) finalized a coverage decision for Aduhelm (Aducanumab) on 7 April 2022. Aduhelm coverage will be limited to individuals participating in randomized controlled trials to confirm the efficacy and safety for the Medicare population.

European review
Aducanumab was rejected for medical use in Europe on 17 December 2021 by the European Medicines Agency (EMA) but it will be left pending as Biogen will be allowed to ask for a re-examination.

Society and culture

Controversy 

The June 2021 approval of the drug by the U.S. Food and Drug Administration (FDA) is considered controversial because clinical trials gave conflicting results on its effectiveness. Specific criticisms of the approval included: insufficient evidence of efficacy, that the drug offers false hope, and that the high cost will adversely impact patient finances and Medicare budget.

Ten of the eleven outside experts that had served on the FDA's Peripheral and Central Nervous System Advisory Committee voted in November 2020 against approving aducanumab. Soon after the approval was announced in early June 2021, three of the panelists who had voted against aducanumab's approval—Joel S. Perlmutter, MD, David S. Knopman, MD, and Aaron Kesselheim, MD, JD, MPH—resigned in protest. Kesselheim said that the FDA move was "probably the worst drug approval decision in recent U.S. history".

Public Citizen and the Institute for Clinical and Economic Review criticized the approval.

Senator Joe Manchin heavily criticized the decision and said that the acting director of the FDA, Janet Woodcock, "should be quickly replaced." According to The New York Times, the review process for the drug "took several unusual turns, including a decision for the FDA to work far more closely with Biogen than is typical in a regulatory review." According to a 2022 report released by two House committees, FDA and Biogen worked in concert to receive accelerated approval at a cost to patients of $56,000 a year.

A 29 June 2021 STAT article reported that in the months prior to Aducanumab's FDA approval, FDA officials had met with "Biogen executives" using "back channels".

On 9 July 2021, the FDA's Acting Commissioner, Janet Woodcock, requested that the Office of Inspector General, U.S. Department of Health and Human Services conduct an independent review of interactions between FDA officials and Biogen representatives prior to the FDA's 27 June approval of aducanumab. It was reported in August that the OIG will also investigate the "accelerated approval pathway, the regulatory mechanism" the FDA used to approve Aducanumab in spite of "conflicting data over whether it could actually slow Alzheimer's patients' mental decline."

Patient advocacy groups had lobbied heavily for the approval of the drug for a debilitating condition with very few therapy choices. Advocacy groups such as Alzheimer's Association, Alzheimer Society of Canada, and Alzheimer's Foundation of America were also in favor of the decision. Alzheimer's Association denies their support for aducanumab was influenced by the at least $1.4 million they received since 2018 from Biogen and Eisai.

In December 2022, a Congressional investigation done by the House Committee on Oversight and Reform and the House Committee on Energy and Commerce was released that found the FDA had  broke with its own protocols in reviewing and approving  aducanumab.  The investigation found that the FDA had held unreported meetings and failed to gain internal consensus before engaging in collaboration with the drugmaker.  The FDA also gave the drug a broad label, allowing it to be used on all Alzheimer’s patients regardless of severity, even though it had only been tested  on people with early Alzheimer’s and mild symptoms.
The report also questioned the agency's decision to abruptly switch from the traditional approval pathway to the accelerated approval pathway to grant approval in the drug's label to a broad patient population.

The investigation further reported concerns related to Biogen's "aggressive launch and marketing plans." They obtained documents that show the company estimated a peak revenue of $18 billion per year with an initial price of $56,000 for patient treatment per year, despite what the Committees described as "a lack of demonstrated clinical benefit in a broad population."  Documents show that Biogen estimated abucanumab would cost the Medicare program $12 billion a year and that Medicare patients would incur out-of-pocket costs that could account for as much as 20% of their income.  Aware that the high price would trigger "pushback" from payers and providers, "Biogen developed an external narrative about the drug's value to sell to the patients and the public."  According to the report, Biogen knew its $56,000 launch price 
was “unjustifiably high,” but company executives wanted to “make history” and “establish Aduhelm as one of the top pharmaceutical launches of all time.”  Findings showed that 
Biogen estimated that from 2020 to 2024 it would spend more than $3.3 billion on sales and marketing.

Economics and cost 
In their 10 June 2021 article, Kaiser Family Foundation (KFF) researchers said that a conservative estimate of the cost to Medicare would be $USD29 billion in one year. This is based on 500,000 Medicare patients potentially receiving Aduhelm. To put this in perspective—in 2019, "total Medicare spending for all doctor-administered drugs reached $37bn." For patients with applicable health insurance and/or Medicare, the drug is a Tier 5 Specialty drug and the copayment for such therapy would be about $11,500 annually. An initial brain positron emission tomography (PET scan) is required to detect the presence of amyloid beta; since 2013, it has not been covered by Medicare, and as of 2018, can cost $2,250 – $10,700. In November 2021, the Centers for Medicare and Medicaid Services (CMS), announced a 14% increase in Medicare Part B premiums for 2022 in response to the expected cost of Aduhelm. A 15 July 2021 article in The Economist reported that the annual price of Aduhelm and the controversial 2021 FDA approval process resulted in the launch of an investigation by the United States House of Representatives, the Committee on Oversight and Reform, and the Committee on Energy and Commerce, making Aduhelm the "poster-child" for the Elijah Cummings Lower Drug Costs Now Act (H.R.3) campaign. By December 2021, Biogen announced a 50% price cut for Aduhelm, from $56,000 to $28,200; this would have no impact on the cost of brain scans.

Sales 
Sales of the drug have been far lower than analyst's predictions.  As of September 2021, only about 100 patients had received the drug, far short of the 10,000 that would be needed by the end of 2021 to meet Wall Street expectations for Biogen's revenue.

References

External links 
 
 
 
 
 Office of Neurology's Summary Review Memorandum U.S. Food and Drug Administration (FDA)

Alzheimer's disease
Monoclonal antibodies
Treatment of Alzheimer's disease